Below is a list of museums in Milan. The city of Milan is an important cultural, artistic, design and fashion center in the north of Italy and it has an excellent museum complex both civic (under the municipality of Milan) and private.

List of museums

External links
 

Milan-related lists
Milan
Milan
Tourist attractions in Milan